The Shore Fast Line was an electric interurban railroad running from Atlantic City, New Jersey, to Ocean City, New Jersey, by way of the mainland communities of Pleasantville, Northfield, Linwood and Somers Point. The line of about  ran from 1907 until 1948, when a hurricane damaged the viaduct and the decline of trolleys meant that the cost to replace it was prohibitive. The company that operated the Shore Fast Line was called Atlantic City and Shore Railroad.

The Atlantic City Quakers who helped develop the Monopoly board game named one of the railroad squares for the Shore Fast Line. Charles and Olive Todd, who taught the game to Charles Darrow, its eventual patentee, shortened the name on their oilcloth board to Short Line. It is also possible that the existence of short-line railroads, those that operate along short distances, influenced that change.

See also
Pennsylvania Railroad
West Jersey and Seashore Railroad
P-RSL
List of New Jersey street railroads

References

New Jersey streetcar lines
Defunct New Jersey railroads
Interurban railways in New Jersey
Electric railways in New Jersey